Robert Pruyn could refer to: 

Robert H. Pruyn (1815–1882), U.S. politician and diplomat and father of Robert C. Pruyn
Robert C. Pruyn (1847–1934), U.S. businessman and son of Robert H. Pruyn